In Nepal, some customary units of measurement are still used, although the metric system has been the official standard since 1968.

Length
The kos (kosh, krosh, koss) is a very ancient measure of distance, measuring about 2.25 miles or 3.7 km.

1 angul = approx. 0.75 inch
4 angul = 1 dharnugrah (bow grip) = 3 in
8 angul = 1 dhanurmushti (fist with thumb raised) = 6 in
12 angul = 1 vitastaa (span) = 9 in
2 vitastaa (cubit) = 18 in
1 haath = 1.5 ft.
1 dand or dhanush (bow) = 4 haath = 6 ft
2000 dand = 1 kos or Gorut = 4000 yards or 2.25 miles 
4 kosh = 1 yojan = 9 miles = 14.48 km

Land area
The precise land measurement conversions as per Nepal standard are as follows:

In a nutshell, The following is a partial list of everyday units used to calculate land area in Nepal. 

1 Khetmuri = 25 Ropani
1 Bigha (बिघा) = 20 Kattha (कठ्ठा) = 6772.63 m² = 72900 sq.ft. = 13.31 Ropani
1 Katha (कठ्ठा) = 20 Dhur (धुर) = 338.63 m² = 3645 sq.ft.
1 Dhur (धुर) = 16.93 m² = 182.25 sq.ft.
1 Ropani (रोपनी) = 16 Aana (आना) = 64 Paisa (पैसा) = 508.72 m² = 5476 sq.ft. = 256 Daam (दाम) = 4 llka
1 Aana (आना)= 4 Paisa (पैसा) = 31.80 m² = 342.25 sq. ft. = 16 Daam (दाम)
1 Paisa (पैसा) = 4 Daam (दाम) = 7.95 m² = 85.56 sq. ft.
1 Daam (दाम) =	1.99 m² = 21.39 sq. ft.

The units of measurement of area of land depends on the part of the country where they are being used, with the Bigha-Katha-Dhur measurements common in the Terai region while the Ropani-Aana measurements are common in hilly and mountainous regions.

Terai region
In the Terai region, the southern parts of Nepal, the customary units are those used elsewhere in South Asia: 
4 katha = 20 dhur
1 bigha = 20 katha

Hilly and mountainous regions
A different system is used in hilly regions:
1 paisa = 4 dam (daam)
1 ana (aana) = 4 paisa
1 ropani = 16 ana

Conversions
1 ropani = 74 feet × 74 feet
1 bigha = 13 Ropani 5 Anna
1 kattha = 442 square yards or 338 square meters

Volume
10 Mutthi (fistful) = 1 Mana
8 Mana = 1 Pathi (4.54596L)
20 Pathi = 1 Muri

See also
List of customary units of measurement in South Asia

References

External links
 Nepali Land-Converter

Nepal
Units
Units
Articles in need of internal merging
1968 establishments in Nepal